The Canadian Champion Three-Year-Old Male Horse is a  Canadian Thoroughbred horse racing honour. Created in 1975 by the Jockey Club of Canada, it is part of the Sovereign Awards program and is awarded annually to the top 3-Year-Old male Thoroughbred horse competing in Canada.

Past winners

1975 : L'Enjoleur
1976 : Norcliffe
1977 : Dance In Time
1978 : Overskate
1979 : Steady Growth
1980 : Ben Fab
1981 : Frost King
1982 : Runaway Groom
1983 : Bompago
1984 : Key to the Moon
1985 : Imperial Choice
1986 : Golden Choice
1987 : Afleet
1988 : Regal Intention
1989 : With Approval
1990 : Izvestia
1991 : Bolulight
1992 : Benburb
1993 : Peteski
1994 : Bruce's Mill
1995 : Peaks and Valleys
1996 : Victor Cooley
1997 : Cryptocloser
1998 : Archers Bay
1999 : Woodcarver
2000 : Kiss A Native
2001 : Win City
2002 : Le Cinquieme Essai
2003 : Wando
2004 : A Bit O'Gold
2005 : Palladio
2006 : Shillelagh Slew
2007 : Alezzandro
2008 : Not Bourbon
2009 : Eye of the Leopard
2010 : Big Red Mike
2011 : Pender Harbour
2012 : Strait of Dover
2013 : Up With the Birds
2014 : Heart to Heart
2015 : Shaman Ghost
2016 : Amis Gizmo
2017 : Channel Maker
2018 : Sky Promise
2019 : Global Access
2020 : Mighty Heart

References

 Sovereign Awards at The Jockey Club of Canada

Sovereign Award winners
Horse racing awards
Horse racing in Canada